Pierre Vaneck (born Pierre Auguste Van Hecke; 15 April 1931 – 31 January 2010) was a French actor. During his career, he won a Molière Award in 1988 and received a César Award nomination in 2009.

Biography
Son of a Belgian army officer, Pierre Vaneck spent his youth in Antwerp, Belgium, until the age of 17, when he started medical studies in Paris, France. Before long, he branched into studying acting, first at the Rene Simon school, and then at the Theatre Academy, under Henri Rollan. He earned his living meanwhile by working for a saddle-maker by day, and in the evenings, he recited François Villon's poems in cabarets. His début on the stage came in 1952 in The Three Musketeers in the role of Louis XIII. His first important role in the cinema was in the Julien Duvivier film, Marianne of my Youth in 1955.

Pierre Vaneck was primarily a theatre and television actor. The general public knew him particularly for his television role as the father of the main character in Fabien Cosma, as well as in many other serials (Spring Tides, The Garonne...). Vaneck died on Sunday 31 January 2010, during open-heart surgery. He was married to Sophie Becker, daughter and sister of Jacques Becker and Jean Becker. His grandchildren, Aurélie and Thibaud Vaneck, are both actors, and feature in the television series Plus Belle la Vie which is broadcast on France 3 channel.

Career

Movies
 1954 : Huis clos by Jacqueline Audry
 1955 : Marianne of My Youth by Julien Duvivier
 1956 : Si Paris nous était conté by Sacha Guitry
 1956 : Celui qui doit mourir by Jules Dassin
 1956 : Pardonnez nos offenses de Robert Hossein
 1958 : Thérèse Etienne by Denys de La Patellière
 1958 : La moucharde with Dany Carrel
 1958 : Une balle dans le canon by Charles Gérard and Michel Deville
 1959 : Merci Natercia by Pierre Kast
 1960 : La Morte saison des amours by Pierre Kast
 1961 : Les Amours célèbres by Michel Boisrond
 1961 : Un nommé La Rocca by Jean Becker
 1963 : Portuguese Vacation by Pierre Kast
 1963 : Thank You, Natercia
 1966 : Les Iles enchantées / As Ilhas encantadas by Carlos Vilardebo
 1966 : Paris brûle-t-il? by René Clément
 1968 : L'Étrangère by Sergio Gobbi
 1968 : Maldonne by Sergio Gobbi
 1969 : Les Patates by Claude Autant-Lara
 1970 : L'Ile aux Coquelicots by Salvatore Adamo
 1971 : Le Seuil du vide by Jean-François Davy
 1971 : Biribi by Daniel Moosmann
 1980 : Le Soleil en face by Pierre Kast
 1980 : La Légion saute sur Kolwezi by Raoul Coutard
 1983 : Erendira by Ruy Guerra
 1993 : Vent d'est by Robert Enrico
 1995 : Othello by Oliver Parker
 1996 : La Propriétaire by Ismail Merchant
 1999 : Là-bas, mon pays by Alexandre Arcady
 1999 : Furia by Alexandre Aja
 2006 : La Science des rêves by Michel Gondry
 2008 : Deux jours à tuer by Jean Becker

Television
 La caméra explore le temps  TV show by Stellio Lorenzi
 1968 : Sarn by Claude Santelli
 1971 : Aux frontières du possible
 1975 : Saint-Just et la force des choses by Pierre Cardinal
 1980 : La fin du marquisat d'Aurel by Guy Lessertisseur
 1981 : Histoires extraordinaires TV show based on Edgar Allan Poe stories
 1982 : Je tue il by Pierre Boutron
 1984 : La Mafia Italian TV show by Sergio Silva
 1988 : Le Démon écarlate by Joseph Drimal
 1990 : Orages d'été, avis de tempête by Jean Sagols
 1992 : Les Cœurs brûlés, by Jean Sagols
 1993 : Les Grandes Marées, by Jean Sagols
 2001 : Fabien Cosma,
 2002 : Garonne by Claude d'Anna
 2003 : Le soleil en face by Philippe Roussel
 2009 : A.D.A. L'argent des Autres by Daniel Benoin

Theatre
 1952 : Les Trois Mousquetaires based on Alexandre Dumas book
 1953 : Sud by Julien Green
 1953 : La Maison de la nuit by Thierry Maulnier
 1953 : La Chair de l'orchidée by James Hadley Chase
 1954 : Pour le roi de Prusse by Maurice Bray
 1954 : L'Ennemi by Julien Green
 1955 : Le Bal des adieux by André Josset
 1955 : L'Éventail de Lady Windermere by Oscar Wilde
 1958 : La Paix du dimanche by John Osborne
 1959 : Les Possédés by Albert Camus
 1959 : Long voyage vers la nuit by Eugene O'Neill
 1960 : Jules César by William Shakespeare
 1961 : Les Violons parfois by Françoise Sagan
 1962 : L'Aiglon by Edmond Rostand
 1963 : La guerre de Troie n'aura pas lieu by Jean Giraudoux
 1963 : Le Cid by Corneille
 1964 : Lorenzaccio by Alfred de Musset
 1964 : Luther by John Osborne, directed Georges Wilson, Festival d'Avignon
 1965 : La Calèche by Jean Giono,
 1965 : Hamlet by William Shakespeare, Directed Georges Wilson, Festival d'Avignon
 1967 : Le Duel by Anton Chekhov
 1967 : Pygmalion by George Bernard Shaw
 1970 : Dom Juan by Molière
 1973 : La Reine de Césarée by Robert Brasillach
 1977 : ''La Nuit de l'iguane by Tennessee Williams
 1980 : La musique adoucit les mœurs by Tom Stoppard
 1983 : Les Exilés by James Joyce
 1985 : Retour à Florence by Henry James
 1986 : La Salle d'attente
 1987 : La Ronde by Arthur Schnitzler
 1987 : Le Secret by Henri Bernstein
 1989 : La Traversée de l'hiver by Yasmina Reza
 1990 : La Fonction by Jean-Marie Besset
 1992 : Le  dernier by Bernard-Henri Lévy
 1993 : Passions secrètes by Jacques-Pierre Amette
 1994 : « Art » by Yasmina Reza
 1996 : La Cour des comédiens by Antoine Vitez
 1999 : Copenhague by Michael Frayn
 2002 : Hysteria by Terry Johnson
 2003 : Déjeuner chez Wittgenstein by Thomas Bernhard
 2006 : Opus Cœur by Israël Horovitz
 2008 : Rock'N'Roll by Tom Stoppard
 2009 : A.D.A. L'Argent des Autres by Jerry Sterner

References

External links

1931 births
2010 deaths
People from Lạng Sơn Province
French male film actors
French male television actors
Belgian emigrants to France
Belgian male film actors
Belgian male television actors
Actors from Antwerp